Silver City is an unincorporated community in Dawson and Forsyth counties, in the U.S. state of Georgia.

History
A post office called Silver City was established in 1886, and remained in operation until 1907. The community's name most likely is a transfer from a city in the Western United States.

References

Unincorporated communities in Georgia (U.S. state)
Unincorporated communities in Dawson County, Georgia
Unincorporated communities in Forsyth County, Georgia